Chani Getter is an American counselor focusing on those leaving the Haredi Jewish community and those in transition.

Early life
Chani Getter was born into a Haredi Jewish family affiliated with the Nikolsburg-Monsey Hasidic community, and was legally married off by her family at the age of seventeen. She had three children over the next five years, before coming out as gay, a story that was covered in the documentary film devOUT and also featured in a PBS documentary television show, Religious & Ethics Newsweekly. She later left her husband with her children, which resulted in divorce. Getter then became a part of the Jewish Renewal movement, and maintained her Orthodox observances for some time. She has been critical of the insular nature of Hasidic communities in New York City.

Career
Getter is the program director at Footsteps, which aids former Haredi Jewish people enter mainstream society, including those exiting in order to follow their natural sexual preferences. Her work as a life coach and counselor was featured in the documentary film One of Us. She also facilitates an LGBTQ women's support group for Keshet.

References

Living people
American Jews
American nonprofit executives
Life coaches
LGBT people from New York (state)
Year of birth missing (living people)
21st-century LGBT people
American Jews from New York (state)